Chris Guccione and André Sá are the defending champions, but chose not to participate.

Purav Raja and Divij Sharan won the title after defeating Ken Skupski and Neal Skupski 6–3, 3–6, [11–9] in the final.

Seeds

Draw

References
 Main Draw

Aegon Manchester Trophy - Doubles
Aegon Manchester Trophy